Brent Sass (born January 2, 1980, in Excelsior, Minnesota) is an American dog musher who is one of only six people to have won both the Iditarod and Yukon Quest sled dog races. He is currently running in the 2023 Iditarod, and is currently in fifth place (first place so far goes to Nicholas Petit).

The Yukon Quest is a 1,000 mile international sled dog race from Whitehorse, Yukon to Fairbanks, Alaska.  He won the Yukon Quest in 2015, 2019 and 2020 and 2023, and the Iditarod in 2022.  He is well known for rescuing other mushers along the Yukon Quest trail throughout his dogsled racing career. In 2011, the rescue efforts of Sass and his then-lead dog Silver at American Summit in blizzard conditions led to the introduction of the Yukon Quest's Silver Award that recognizes sled dogs that have performed acts of heroism on the trail.

Dogsled racing career

In 2012, Sass participated in his first Iditarod Trail Sled Dog Race and earned Rookie of the Year honors.

In 2015, Sass won the Yukon Quest in nine days, 12 hours, and 49 minutes. He also competed in the 2015 Iditarod, but his quest to become the second musher to win both the Yukon Quest and the Iditarod in the same year fell short as he was disqualified from the Iditarod for possessing an iPod Touch during the race; the iPod Touch was deemed a prohibited two-way communications device due to its built-in Wi-Fi Internet connectivity feature. Sass was in fifth place at the time of the disqualification.

During the 2016 Iditarod, Sass' dogs refused to leave the White Mountain checkpoint, 77 miles (124 km) from Nome. Sass did not want to force his dogs to leave, fearing the decision would negatively impact his team. Sass fed them, waited until they were ready, and took it slow to the finish line. Originally in 3rd place, he subsequently dropped to 20th place which resulted in Sass losing $44,175 in prize money.

In 2017 Brent withdrew from the Yukon Quest 1000 mile race, at a checkpoint, he also withdrew, prior to the race from the Iditarod.  Focus is on health of dogs and kennel.  Taking some well-deserved personal time off. Several of the Wild and Free dogs did participate in the Iditarod for other mushers.

In 2020 Brent Sass won the Yukon Quest  which he began on Feb.1 and finished on Feb. 11 at 1:51 p.m. AST

On March 15, 2022, Brent Sass won the 2022 Iditarod.

Television
Sass appeared in the first season of Ultimate Survival Alaska which aired in 2013.

References

External links
 

1980 births
Dog mushers from Alaska
Iditarod champions
Living people
People from Excelsior, Minnesota
Sportspeople from Fairbanks, Alaska
University of Alaska Fairbanks alumni